Streptomyces baliensis is a bacterium species from the genus of Streptomyces which has been isolated from soil from the Bali Botanic Garden on the Bali Island in Indonesia.

See also 
 List of Streptomyces species

References

Further reading

External links
Type strain of Streptomyces baliensis at BacDive -  the Bacterial Diversity Metadatabase

baliensis
Bacteria described in 2009